is a train station in the town of Kawanehon, Haibara District, Shizuoka Prefecture, Japan, operated by the Ōigawa Railway. It was built primarily to support dam construction activities in the area in the 1960s.

Lines

Station layout
The station has two opposed side platforms serving two tracks, connected to a small station building by a level crossing. The station is unattended.

Station history
Omori Station was opened on August 1, 1959.

Passenger statistics
In fiscal 2017, the station was used by an average of 0.5 passengers daily (boarding passengers only).

Surrounding area
Located in an isolated mountain area surrounded by forests, it has very few passengers.
Oi River

See also
 List of Railway Stations in Japan

References

External links

 Ōigawa Railway home page

Stations of Ōigawa Railway
Railway stations in Shizuoka Prefecture
Railway stations in Japan opened in 1959
Kawanehon, Shizuoka